Robert Folk (born March 5, 1949) is an American film and television composer and conductor who has written many movie scores, as well as other orchestral music in a classical style.

Life and career
Robert Folk is a graduate and former faculty member of the Juilliard School in New York City. Since completing his doctorate, Dr. Folk has composed and conducted the musical scores for over 95 feature films. His extensive credits include Ace Ventura: When Nature Calls, Nothing To Lose, Tremors (uncredited), The NeverEnding Story II: The Next Chapter, Toy Soldiers, Beastmaster 2: Through the Portal of Time, Police Academy, Kung Pow! Enter the Fist, Boat Trip, Back in the Day, American Pie: Band Camp and most recently, Van Wilder 2 and Vivaldi.

Folk has worked with many top filmmakers including Steve Oedekerk, George Gallo, Dan Petrie Jr., Gary Sinise, Hugh Wilson, Jonathan Betuel, Don Bluth, Jon Davison, Gary Goldman, Steve Rash, David Permut, Andy Hurst, Gene Quintano, Roger Birnbaum, Ron Underwood, Mark Burg, Thom Mount, Paul Maslansky, Michael Caleo, George Miller, Fred Zollo, Marty Bregman, Gale Anne Hurd, Marco Weber, Ringo Lam, James Robinson, Richard Williams, Jake Eberts and Gary Barber, to name a few.

Folk has also composed and conducted numerous concert works including Symphonic, Vocal and Chamber music compositions. His Ballet “To Dream Of Roses,” composed for the Osaka Worlds Fair, was recorded by the London Symphony Orchestra. Mr Folk is a member of the Academy of Motion Picture Arts and Sciences, and the American Society of Composers, Authors and Publishers.

He is a prolific songwriter and producer, and has conducted many prominent international orchestras including: The London Symphony Orchestra, The Royal Philharmonic Orchestra, The Berlin Radio Orchestra, The Munich Symphony, The Dublin Symphony Orchestra, The Moscow Symphony Orchestra and the London Sinfonia.

Filmography

 Savage Harvest (1981)
 The Slayer (1982)
 Police Academy (1984)
 Purple Hearts (1984)
 Bachelor Party (1984)
 Police Academy 2: Their First Assignment (1985)
 Thunder Alley (1985)
 Odd Jobs (1986)
 Police Academy 3: Back in Training (1986)
 Stewardess School (1986)
 Police Academy 4: Citizens on Patrol (1987)
 Can't Buy Me Love (1987)
 Police Academy 5: Assignment Miami Beach (1988)
 Miles from Home (1988)
 Wicked Stepmother (1989)
 Police Academy 6: City Under Siege (1989)
 Happy Together (1989)
 Honeymoon Academy (1989) (Video)
 Tremors (1990) (uncredited)
 The NeverEnding Story II: The Next Chapter (1990)
 To Dream of Roses (1990)
 Toy Soldiers (1991)
 Beastmaster 2: Through the Portal of Time (1991)
 A Climate for Killing (1991)
 Rock-a-Doodle (1991)
 Dragon and Slippers (1991) (TV Movie)
 Loaded Weapon 1 (1993)
 The Princess and the Cobbler (1993)
 Police Academy: Mission to Moscow (1994)
 In the Army Now (1994)
 A Troll in Central Park (1994)
 Trapped in Paradise (1994)
 Ace Ventura: When Nature Calls (1995)
 Theodore Rex (1995)
 The Lawnmower Man 2: Beyond Cyberspace (1996)
 Maximum Risk (1996)
 Rule of Three (1996)
 Booty Call (1997)
 Nothing to Lose (1997)
 Major League: Back to the Minors (1998)
 The Jungle Book: Mowgli's Story (1998) (Video)
 You're Dead... (1999)
 Held Up (1999)
 Thumb Wars (1999)
 All the Queen's Men (2001)
 Kung Pow! Enter the Fist (2002)
 Boat Trip (2002)
 In the Shadow of the Cobra (2004)
 El sol de los venados (2004)
 Back in the Day (2005)
 American Pie Presents: Band Camp (2005) (Video)
 Van Wilder: The Rise of Taj (2006)
 Beethoven's Big Break (2008) (Video)
 Underground (2010)
 Elephant White (2010)
 Silver Cord (2011)
 Vivaldi (2011)
 Havana Heat (2011)
 There Be Dragons (2011)
 The Secret Village (2013)
 The Kid (2015)
 Silent Life (2016)
 Once Upon A Time In Vegas (2023)

Television
 Knots Landing (2 episodes, 1982-1983)
 Hart to Hart (4 episodes, 1982-1983)
 Falcon Crest (2 episodes, 1983–1984)
 Faerie Tale Theatre (3 episodes, 1984–1987)
 Tall Tales & Legends (1 episode, 1985)
 Prince of Bel Air (1986)
 Walt Disney's Wonderful World of Color (1 episode, 1986)
 The New Twilight Zone (2 episodes, 1986)
 Combat Academy (1986)
 The Room Upstairs (1987)
 Glory Days (1988)
 Jesse Hawkes (1 episode, 1989)
 Mario and the Mob (1992)
 Shadowhunter (1993)
 Sworn to Vengeance (1993)
 Two Fathers: Justice for the Innocent (1994)
 State of Emergency (1994)
 Search and Rescue (1994)
 Family Reunion: A Relative Nightmare (1995)
 National Lampoon's Thanksgiving Family Reunion (2003)

Awards and nominations

References

External links

1949 births
20th-century American conductors (music)
20th-century American male musicians
21st-century American conductors (music)
21st-century American male musicians
American classical musicians
American film score composers
American male conductors (music)
American male film score composers
American male songwriters
American music educators
American television composers
Animated film score composers
Classical musicians from New York (state)
Composers from New York City
Educators from New York City
Juilliard School alumni
Juilliard School faculty
Living people
Male television composers
Musicians from New York City
Record producers from New York (state)
Songwriters from New York (state)